Pierre d'Amboise (1408 – 28 June 1473) was a French nobleman of the House of Amboise. He was a son of Hugh VIII of Amboise, who was killed at the battle of Agincourt, and of Jeanne de Guénand.

Titles and offices
Conseiller and chamberlain to Charles VII.
Governor of Touraine.
Louis XI's ambassador to Rome.
Lord of Chaumont, Meillant, Sagonne, Les Rochettes, Asnières (in Blésois), Saint-Vérain, Bussy, Preuilly, Les Bordes-Guénand, Moulins, Charenton, etc.
With his cousin Louis d'Amboise, he fought alongside Joan of Arc at the Siege of Orléans (January 1429).
He participated in the "Praguerie" under the rule of Charles VII.
He participated in the League of the Public Weal under the rule of Louis XI, who, in reprisals, confiscated all his goods and had his main fortress at Chaumont destroyed.

Marriage and issue

On 23 August 1428 he married Anne de Bueil, Dame d'Aubijoux, daughter of Jean IV de Bueil and of Marguerite Dauphine d'Auvergne, countess of Sancerre.

They had 17 children, including:
Charles I of Amboise, favourite of Louis XI
Louis (1433–1503), bishop of Albi
John VII of Amboise, bishop and Duke of Langres
Jacques d'Amboise
A son (1440–1498), seigneur de Bussy, married Catherine de Saint-Belin (issue)
Georges d'Amboise (1460–1510), a cardinal and minister of state under Louis XII
Hugues (?–1515), seigneur d'Aubijoux, married Madeleine de Lescun, dame de Sauveterre (issue)
Pierre (?–1505), Bishop of Poitiers
Emery (?–1512), Grand-Master of the Order of Malta, head of the armies of Francis I of France on the Milan campaigns
Marie, married Jean de Hangest, seigneur de Genlis
Anne, married Jacques de Chazeron
Louise (?–1516), married Guillaume Gouffier de Boissy
Madeleine d'Amboise (1461–1497), abbess of Charenton and of Saint Menoux 
Marguerite (?–1495). First married Jean Crespin, and then on 10 October 1457 Jean II de Rochechouart, baron de Mortemer
Catherine, dame de Linières, who married Baron Pierre de Castelnau-Caylus

Pierre d'Amboise died in his castle of Meillant in Berry.  On his death he was buried in the nunnery of Order of Poor Ladies he had founded at Bourges.

References
Carré de Busserolle, "Dictionnaire géographique, historique et biographique de l'Indre et Loire" T.1, 1878, p. 35.
Louis Moréri, "Dictionnaire historique".
François de Belleforest, "Les grandes annales et histoire générale de France"  T.2, 1579, p. 1125.
P. Champion, "Louis XI" T.1, pp. 130–134.

1408 births
1473 deaths
Pierre d'Amboise